Sainte-Anne-du-Lac (Aviation PLMG Inc.) Aerodrome  is located adjacent to Sainte-Anne-du-Lac, Quebec, Canada.

References

Registered aerodromes in Laurentides